BOMA  is a U.S. nonprofit organization and Kenyan NGO that works to provide poor women living in the arid and semi-arid lands of Northern Kenya with the educational, financial, and technological resources to lift themselves out of poverty. Its mission is to “empower women in the drylands of Africa to establish sustainable livelihoods, build resilient families, graduate from extreme poverty and catalyze change in their rural communities.” 

Since 2009, The BOMA Project claims to have aided 26,614 women in starting new businesses and impacted 133,070 dependent children, also reporting their participants’ increased ability to afford food, school fees, and medical care. It aims to reach one million women and children by 2022.

History
In 2005, The Boma Project was founded by Kathleen Colson after she observed the exacerbating effects of climate change on poverty in Northern Kenya and proceeded to travel across the region with Ahmed “Kura” Omar to develop the Rural Entrepreneur Access Project (REAP).

Program
The Rural Entrepreneur Access Project (REAP) is BOMA's two-year poverty graduation program, which uses a similar approach to a graduation model performed in six countries that was mostly considered by the New York Times as “enormously successful.” This program is implemented in the Marsabit and Samburu counties of Northern Kenya where the poverty rate was 71% in 2016 (25.8% higher than the national poverty rate) and where a series of climate change-induced droughts have occurred since 1992, culminating in the Kenyan government’s declaration of a national drought emergency in February 2017. As a result, the livelihoods of local pastoral communities (which largely depend on livestock) have been severely affected, leaving many in extreme poverty and food insecurity. REAP aims to empower the women of these vulnerable communities by helping them start sustainable businesses and establish savings groups to beat poverty and build resiliency against social,economic and climate shocks.

REAP consists of six steps

 Targeting communities: Field officers and community members identify the poorest women to participate in the program. 
 Mentoring: BOMA mentors help participants launch three-women business groups and provide support for a duration of two years. 
 Cash transfer: Each woman is given seed capital to set up their enterprises.  
 Financial, life skills, and human rights training: Participants are trained in basic economic concepts and skills in financial management, family planning, and household decision-making. 
 Savings: Participants join savings associations (made from multiple business groups) to gain access to credit.  
 Financial Inclusion: BOMA helps participants open bank accounts and provide them with mobile phones to access M-PESA, a Kenyan mobile money transfer system.

In 2013, the BOMA Project was a recipient of the UNFCCC’s Momentum for Change Lighthouse Activity Award.  In 2015, The Boma Project passed ImpactMatters' impact audit.  The Boma Project currently holds a Platinum rating on Guidestar.

Results 
According to a 2016 survey, BOMA participants saw their monthly incomes increase by 147%, their savings increased by 1,400%, and the number of children going to bed hungry declined by 63%. In addition, 92% of women graduated from extreme poverty and 97% of BOMA businesses are still in operation after a year.

Funding 
The BOMA Project is funded by individual donors, foundations, and government agencies.  Major corporate donors include Aid for Africa, the Bill & Melinda Gates Foundation, Boeing, Feed the Future Innovation Lab for Assets and Market Access, International Fund for Agricultural Development, the Mastercard Foundation, the Montpelier Foundation, the Mulago Foundation, the Peery Foundation, the Planet Wheeler Foundation, the Skees Family Foundation, the UK Department for International Development, the United States Agency for International Development, and the Vibrant Village Foundation.

References 

International nongovernmental organizations
Non-profit organizations based in the United States
Organisations based in Kenya